In group theory, Matsumoto's theorem, proved by ,  gives conditions for two reduced words of a Coxeter group to represent the same element.

Statement

If two reduced words represent the same element of a Coxeter group, then Matsumoto's theorem states that the first word can be transformed into the second by repeatedly transforming
xyxy... to yxyx... (or vice versa)
where 
xyxy... = yxyx...
is one of the defining relations of the Coxeter group.

Applications

Matsumoto's theorem implies that there is a natural map (not a group homomorphism) from a Coxeter group to the corresponding braid group, taking any element of the Coxeter group represented by some reduced word in the generators to the same word in the generators of the braid group.

References

Theorems in group theory
Braid groups